Karanovac is a Serbo-Croatian toponym, derived from masculine given name Karan. It may refer to:

Karanovac, Petrovo, Bosnia and Herzegovina
Karanovac, Varvarin, Serbia
Old name for Kraljevo, Serbia

See also
Karanović, surname
Karanovci, placename

Serbo-Croatian place names